William Roscoe Kintner (21 April 1915 – 1 February 1997) was an American soldier, foreign policy analyst, and diplomat.

Kintner was born in Lock Haven, Pennsylvania to Joseph and Florence Kintner, the eighth of nine children. He was appointed to the United States Military Academy in 1936, and was commissioned a second lieutenant upon graduating in 1940. A career Army officer, he landed at Omaha Beach for Operation Overlord during the invasion of Normandy in 1944. He served during the Korean War as an infantry battalion commander during the Battle of Pork Chop Hill. He retired from the U.S. Army as a colonel in 1961, having earned the Bronze Star Medal and Legion of Merit, both with oak leaf clusters.

While in the service, he earned an M.A. and Ph.D. from Georgetown University in 1948. His doctoral dissertation, a study of the Communist Party of the Soviet Union, was published in 1950 as The Front is Everywhere. Upon retiring from the Army, he taught political science at the University of Pennsylvania, where he remained as professor until 1985. He was deputy director of the Foreign Policy Research Institute until 1969, when he became director. In 1973, President Gerald Ford appointed him U.S. Ambassador to Thailand, a post in which he served from 1973 to 1975. After his diplomatic stint, he returned to Philadelphia in 1975 to serve as president as FPRI and as editor of its journal, Orbis. In that capacity he initiated a joint project with Soviet Institute for the Study of the United States in Canada which permitted the yearly exchange of top non-governmental scholars despite strained cold war diplomatic relations.

In 1986, President Ronald Reagan appointed him to the board of directors of the United States Institute for Peace.

Kintner was a prolific author, writing on foreign policy, arms control, and strategic planning until his death in 1997 of cancer at the age of 81. He is interred at Bryn Athyn Cemetery in Bryn Athyn, Pennsylvania.

Personal life
Kintner married Xandree Hyatt in 1940, and the couple had three daughters and a son. Widowed in 1986, he married Faith Child Halterman in 1987.

Works
Articles
 "The Orchestration of Crisis." Esquire, May 1959, pp. 59–63.

Books
The Front Is Everywhere: Militant Communism in Action. Norman: University of Oklahoma Press, 1950. .
Atomic Weapons in Land Combat, with Colonel G.C. Reinhardt (1953)
Forging a New Sword, a Study of the Department of Defense with Joseph Coffey and Raymond Albright (1958)
Protracted Conflict: A Challenging Study of Communist Strategy, with James E. Dougherty, Alvin J. Cottrell, and Robert Strausz-Hupé (1959)
A Forward Strategy for America, sequel to Protracted Conflict, with Stefan T. Possony and Robert Strausz-Hupé (1961) 
The New Frontier of War: Political Warfare, Present and Future (1962) .
Building the Atlantic World (1963) 
Peace and the Strategy Conflict (1967)
The Nuclear Revolution in Soviet Military Affairs (1968) 
Safeguard: Why the ABM Makes Sense (1969)
The Prudent Case for Safeguard (1969)
The Uncertain Strategic Balance in the 1970's (1969)
Eastern Europe and European Security (1971) 
Soviet Military Trends: Implications for U.S. Security, with Robert L. Pfaltzgraff (1971) 
National Strategy in a Decade of Change: An Emerging United States Policy, with Richard Foster (1973) 
SALT: Implications for Arms Control in the 1970s (1973) 
Technology and International Politics: the Crisis of Wishing (1975) 
A Matter of Two Chinas: the China-Taiwan Issue in U.S. Foreign Policy, with John Franklin Copper (1979)
Soviet Global Strategy (1987) 
Arms Control: the American Dilemma (1987) 
The Role of Ancient Israel "Written with the Finger of God": A Swedenborgian Perspective of the History of the Israelites From Abraham to Jesus (1996)

References 

2. Thy Will Be Done: The Conquest of the Amazon: Nelson Rockefeller & Evangelism in the Age of Oil by Gerard Colby & Charlotte Dennett, Chapter 25 Building The Warfare State, p. 370 with references to William Kintner mainly on page 371.

External links

Tribute to William Kintner given by Congressman Jon D. Fox
Online Archive of California: Inventory of the William R. Kintner papers, 1951–1986
U.S. State Department Office of the Historian: William Roscoe Kintner

Ambassadors of the United States to Thailand
American political scientists
People from Lock Haven, Pennsylvania
1915 births
1997 deaths
Foreign Policy Research Institute
United States Army personnel of World War II
United States Army personnel of the Korean War
United States Army colonels
Recipients of the Legion of Merit
Deaths from cancer in the United States
Military personnel from Pennsylvania
20th-century political scientists